Dragan Pantelić (Serbian Cyrillic: Драган Пантелић; 9 December 1951  – 20 October 2021) was a Yugoslav  professional footballer who played as a goalkeeper. He scored over 20 goals over the course of his career, mainly from penalties.

Biography
Pantelić was born in Loznica, Serbia. After starting out at Rađevac and Grafičar Beograd, Pantelić spent ten seasons with Radnički Niš from 1971 to 1981. He amassed over 250 appearances in the Yugoslav First League, netting 15 goals. In a league fixture against Velež Mostar, he scored the match-winning goal from inside his own penalty area.

Pantelić later moved abroad to France and joined Bordeaux, representing the side for two seasons. In 1982, Bordeaux played without a goalkeeper in a match away to Nantes in protest at a suspension for Pantelić. Nantes won 6–0. The match became a staple of football 'blooper' videos.

After briefly playing for Timok in the Yugoslav Second League, Pantelić returned to Radnički Niš in the 1984–85 season, before retiring from the game.

Pantelić died on 20 October 2021, at the Niš University clinical center after short battle with COVID-19. He was 69.

International career
At international level, Pantelić earned 19 caps for Yugoslavia between 1979 and 1984, scoring two goals. He also represented the country at the 1980 Summer Olympics, as they finished in fourth place and took part at the 1982 FIFA World Cup.

International goals

Source: 11v11

Post-playing career
After ending his playing career, Pantelić temporarily served as manager of Radnički Niš between November 1989 and March 1990. He was also the president of the club in the late 1990s.

Political career
Pantelić  was a member of 
Party of  Serbian Unity  (SSJ), founded by Željko Ražnatović Arkan. He was a member of Serbian Parliament in 2000–2004.

Honours
Radnički Niš
 Balkans Cup: 1975

References

External links
 
 

1951 births
2021 deaths
Sportspeople from Loznica
Yugoslav footballers
Serbian footballers
Association football goalkeepers
Yugoslavia international footballers
Olympic footballers of Yugoslavia
Footballers at the 1980 Summer Olympics
1982 FIFA World Cup players
Yugoslav First League players
Ligue 1 players
FK Radnički Niš players
FC Girondins de Bordeaux players
FK Timok players
Yugoslav football managers
FK Radnički Niš managers
Expatriate footballers in France
Yugoslav expatriate sportspeople in France
Yugoslav expatriate footballers
Members of the National Assembly (Serbia)
Deaths from the COVID-19 pandemic in Serbia